John Royston Siddons  (5 October 1927 – 22 September 2016) was an Australian politician. He was a businessman and the executive chairman of Siddons Industries Ltd. before entering politics.

Siddons was born on 5 October 1927 in Melbourne, the second child of Agnes Emily née Smith and Royston Siddons an industrialist and founder of the Sidchrome and Ramset brands in Australia. John would work in the family business, eventually replacing Royston as chairman.

In 1980, he was elected to the Australian Senate as a Democrats senator for Victoria. He was defeated at the 1983 election, when he was required to take second place on the Democrats ticket in deference to party leader Don Chipp. He was, however, re-elected in the 1984 election, when seven places were up for election due to the expansion of the Parliament. In 1986, he left the Democrats, claiming that the party had moved too far to the left. In 1987, he registered the Unite Australia Party, amalgamating two other minor parties, the Advance Australia Party and the remnants of the Australia Party. He was joined in the Senate by South Australian Democrat David Vigor. The new party contested the 1987 election but received under 1% in all states contested. Siddons and Vigor were both defeated.

He died in 2016, aged 88.

References

Sources
Siddons, John Royston; Gleeson, Russ. "A Spanner in the Works" (autobiography). Macmillan, Melbourne (1990)

Australian manufacturing businesspeople
Australian Democrats members of the Parliament of Australia
Independent members of the Parliament of Australia
Members of the Australian Senate for Victoria
Members of the Australian Senate
1927 births
2016 deaths
People educated at Wesley College (Victoria)
Unite Australia Party members of the Parliament of Australia
20th-century Australian politicians
Officers of the Order of Australia